Sial  is a village in Kapurthala district of Punjab State, India. The village is administrated by a Sarpanch, who is an elected representative.

Demography 
According to the report published by Census India in 2011, Sial has 50 houses with the total population of 293 persons of which 143 are male and 150 females. Literacy rate of Sial is 76.61%, higher than the state average of 75.84%.  The population of children in the age group 0–6 years is 45 which is 15.36% of the total population. Child sex ratio is approximately 1143, higher than the state average of 846.

Population data

References

External links
  Villages in Kapurthala
 Kapurthala Villages List

Villages in Kapurthala district